The sixth season of Bake Off Brasil premiered on August 15, 2020 at  on SBT.

After Nadja Haddad tested positive for COVID during filming, Chris Flores originally filled in as host, but was replaced by former main host Ticiana Villas Boas, who returned to the show (and Brazilian television) for the first time since the season 2 finale in 2016, which was followed by the bribery scandal between her husband Joesley Batista and former president Michel Temer in 2017.

Ticiana's unexpected return led to speculation in the media that she would replace Nadja permanently due to her influence in bringing sponsors from her husband's corporates back to the show. However, when one of the current sponsors, Döhler, learned from the press that SBT had replaced Nadja with Ticiana, they demanded her return as they already had hired her to be their poster girl.

Nadja Haddad finally returned to host the show after being away from filming for three weeks during her recovery, while Ticiana was announced as the new host of the spin-off show Bake Off Brasil: A Cereja do Bolo.

Bakers
The following is a list of contestants:

Results summary

Key

Technical challenges ranking

Key
  Star Baker
  Eliminated

Ratings and reception

Brazilian ratings
All numbers are in points and provided by Kantar Ibope Media.

References

External links 

 Bake Off Brasil on SBT

2020 Brazilian television seasons